Feistein Lighthouse is a coastal lighthouse in Rogaland county, Norway.  The lighthouse is located on a small island in Klepp municipality, off the coast of Jæren. It was established in 1859, and automated in 1990.

The tower is painted red with two white stripes towards the top. The secondary lights can be seen for slightly less distance. The lighthouse also emits a morse code "T" racon signal.

See also

Lighthouses in Norway
List of lighthouses in Norway

References

External links

 Norsk Fyrhistorisk Forening 

Lighthouses completed in 1859
Lighthouses in Rogaland
Listed lighthouses in Norway
Klepp